The Independent Girls' Schools Sporting Association (formerly known as IGSSA now trading as IGSA Sport), was established in Sydney, New South Wales, Australia, in 1922 with five founding members, all of them independent girls' schools.

Today, the thirty-two members' schools of AHIGS are eligible to participate and compete against each other in a number of sporting carnivals and interschool sports through IGSA Sport (formerly known as IGSSA). Secondary school girls compete in team and individual sports at school level and can be selected to represent IGSA Sport as part of the NSWCIS and All Schools sporting pathways.

History
The Independent Girls' Schools Sporting Association was established in 1922 as the Girls Secondary Schools Sports Union. Commencing with just five members, all of them independent, Protestant schools for girls, IGSSA grew rapidly in the 1980s and 90s following the introduction of graded competition for many sports, improving competitions and adding new sports.

Today IGSA Sport (or the AHIGS Sporting Committee, formerly known as IGSSA) is a sub–committee of the Association of Heads of Independent Girls' Schools (AHIGS).

Schools

Current member schools

Former member schools

Sports 
The IGSA Sport Committee (formerly IGSSA) organises competitions among 32 independent girls' schools in New South Wales. Secondary school girls compete in team and individual sports at school level and may be selected through IGSA Sport for higher representative pathways. IGSA Sport works with each member school's physical education and sport programme by providing interschool competition from beginners to elite level.

IGSA Sport graded competitions are held on Saturday mornings and involve between 5000 and 6300 participants each term. Students may choose each term:

Term One
Badminton
Tennis
Water Polo
Touch 

Term Two
Basketball
Football
Hockey
Netball

Term Three
Netball
Hockey
Basketball
Football

Term Four
Water polo
Tennis
Touch

Carnivals
In addition to IGSSA Saturday graded competitions, the association holds six annual carnivals in seven sports:
Rowing
Swimming and Diving
Tildesley Tennis
Cross Country Running
Athletics
Gymnastics

Rowing
The IGSA Sport Rowing Regatta is typically held in March at the Sydney International Regatta Centre. The ten schools that offer a rowing programme, and therefore regularly compete in the regatta are: Ascham, Canberra Girls' Grammar School, Loreto Kirribilli, Loreto Normanhurst, MLC School, the Presbyterian Ladies' College, Sydney, Pymble Ladies' College, Queenwood School for Girls, Roseville College, and Tara Anglican School for Girls. These schools also make up the bulk of entries at the Schoolgirls Head of the River regatta.

Swimming and diving
The IGSA Sport Swimming and Diving carnival has been held annually since 1925. Today it is typically held in March at the Sydney Olympic Park Aquatic Centre.

In both sports, schools compete in divisions (three for swimming and two for diving) based on their results from the previous year. Both divisions have the same point score and the highest total point score within each division is deemed the Division Champion and presented with a shield. The winning school from each of the first divisions is awarded the carnival champion.

Athletics
The IGSA Sport Track and Field carnival has been held annually since 1923. Today it is typically held in June at Sydney Olympic Park. Competing schools are divided into three divisions based on their results from the previous year. The Division Champions are presented with a shield, with the winning school of the first divisions awarded the carnival champion.

Gymnastics
The IGSA Sport annual Gymnastics Carnival was first held in 1969. Today the carnival is typically held in October, at the Sydney Olympic Park Sports Centre in Sydney Olympic Park. Students may compete in either Rhythmic (RG) or Artistic (WAG) gymnastics, and schools are placed in divisions (two for rhythmic and three for artistic) based on their results from the previous year. Through combined WAG and RG results, a Champion school is declared.

Tildesley Tennis

The Tildesley Tennis Shield competition is IGSSA's longest running carnival. It was first held in 1918, with the now defunct Normanhurst School in Ashfield declared the champion school, and Daphne Akhurst (1903–1933) the winner of the singles competition. Akhurst was to become one of the best female tennis players Australia has ever produced. She was a pupil of Normanhurst School, which in 1918 had as its Headmistress, Miss Evelyn Mary Tildesley (1882–1976) from Staffordshire, England. Normanhurst School had a very successful tennis program, and by the 1920s had produced two of Australia's most famous female tennis players, with Rosie Payten in addition to Daphne Akhurst. It was Tildesley who donated "a beautiful oak and bronze shield" for a tennis competition which encouraged team spirit among Sydney's Protestant girls' schools.

The Shield was to be presented to the school which showed the best average score in tennis, with each school sending a tenth of its students over the age of twelve. The idea behind this was that each school would be able to give many of their pupils the chance of playing, rather than just a few very talented students, as was the case with the School Girls' Championships held by the New South Wales Lawn Tennis Association.

Tildesley was inspired by American tennis tournaments in determining how her competition would be scored. In such tournaments, a percentage of games won against games played is taken. This system of scoring has often been criticised over the years, particularly by the larger schools, and to this day it remains highly unusual for a large school to win the Tildesley Shield. It is however apparent that the reasoning that prompted Tildesley was that of encouraging more participation in tennis among the 12 Protestant schools operating in 1918, and to have a scoring system which rewarded the school with the best average.

Until 1922, the competition was managed by the Girls Secondary Schools Lawn Tennis Association, and after this time, the Girls Secondary Schools Sports Union (now IGSSA). From 1922 until 1944, the Tildesley Shield was held, where possible, on three consecutive Saturdays in October at White City Stadium. In 1918 it was held at the Double Bay Courts, as White City was then a fun parlour which was taken over for grass courts circa 1920–21. Matches were the best of eight games, with entries based on a 1:15 ratio for girls 12 years and over on 1 October, with a minimum of 12 (6 singles, 3 doubles) and a maximum of 32 (16 singles, 8 doubles).

From 1944 to 1946, the numbers were modified to 1:25, with a minimum of eight (4 singles, 2 doubles) and a maximum of 20 (10 singles, 5 doubles). In 1947 it reverted to the original scheme until 1971 when the entry scheme was redrafted. In 1980, it was again redrafted to a system of a 1:22 ratio, by Miss Patti Dyson, then Headmistress of PLC Sydney. All matches are now one set only, first to 9 games, no advantage. A tie-breaker is used at 7–all in quarter finals, semi-finals and finals only. Games won, games lost, games played in all singles and doubles matches are totalled for each school, with the final percentage for each school being the number of games won over the number of games played.

The continuous attempts to redraft the conditions of the Shield are largely due to the prestigious place the competition holds in Independent Girls' School Tennis. However, it has remained essential that the conditions stay true to the principles of the donor. If Miss Tildesley had wished the Shield to be reserved for the champions, which would have led to her school winning more often, then the conditions of play would have been much different. However, Tildesley, along with her sister Beatrice and Mr Henry Marsh, who had developed the concept with her, insisted that the school with the best average of games won the Shield. As Marsh explained in his article in the Normanhurst Jubilee Magazine: 

In 1998, Mr Peter Spender donated a trophy for the Most Improved Tildesley Shield Tournament School, in memory of his wife Diane Greaves, an ex–SCEGGS Darlinghurst student. Any school who improves their position from the previous year automatically becomes eligible to win the Spender trophy.
	
Today the Tildesley Shield Competition is open to all IGSSA schools, with 24 of them typically choosing to compete, and takes place at Eastwood Thornleigh District Tennis Association courts at Pennant Hills, New South Wales over three consecutive days, usually in March / April.  Entry is accepted according to a ratio of secondary enrolments to a maximum number of matches in singles and doubles, which may change slightly each year due to changes in enrolment numbers.

Tildesley Shield winners

Notable IGSSA sportswomen

Athletics
Melinda Gainsford-Taylor (St Vincents)

Cricket
Margaret Elizabeth Maynard Peden (Abbotsleigh)
Ellyse Perry (Pymble)

Cycling 
Kate Bates (Tara and PLC Sydney)

Diving
Vanessa Baker (MLC School)
Bindi Mansfield (Meriden)
Kathyrn Blackshaw (Meriden)
Nicole Ng (PLC Sydney)

Gymnastics
Penelope Blackmore – Commonwealth Games Rhythmic Gymnast (MLC School)
Danielle Le Ray – Olympic Rhythmic Gymnast (Meriden)
Amelia McVeigh- Rhythmic Gymnast (PLC Sydney)

Netball
Liz Ellis (Abbotsleigh)

Rowing
 Jennifer Emerson (PLC Sydney)
 Elizabeth Kell (MLC School)
 Julia Veness-Collins (PLC Sydney)

Football
Ellyse Perry (Pymble)

Skiing
 Cynthia Mitchell (Santa Sabina)
Zali Steggall (Queenwood)

Swimming
Natasha Bowron (PLC Sydney)
 Lorraine Crapp (MLC School)
Margaret Elaine Dovey (SCEGGS)
Nanette Duncan (PLC Sydney)
Elizabeth Fraser (PLC Sydney)
 Felicity Galvez (MLC School)
Emma Johnson (PLC Sydney)
Melissa Mitchell (Pymble)
Ming Xiu Ong (Pymble)
Annabelle Williams (PLC Sydney)

Tennis
Daphne Akhurst (Normanhurst School)
Sophie Ferguson (Pymble)
Nicole Kriz (PLC Sydney)

See also 
 List of non-government schools in New South Wales

References

External links 
 IGSA Sport Website
 AHIGS Website
 Archdale Debating Competition

Australian school sports associations

Sport in New South Wales